Mxenge is an African surname. Notable people with the surname include:

Griffiths Mxenge (1935–1981), South African anti-apartheid activist
Victoria Mxenge (1942–1985), South African anti-apartheid activist, wife of Griffiths 

Xhosa-language surnames